Dave Bry (December 18, 1970 – October 15, 2017) was an American writer, music journalist, and editor. He served as editor of Vibe, Spin, and XXL and was a columnist for The Awl. He also authored a non-fiction book, Public Apology: In Which a Man Grapples with a Lifetime of Regret, One Incident at a Time (Grand Central, 2013).

Early life
Bry was born in 1970 in Red Bank, New Jersey and raised in nearby Little Silver. His father was a psychologist and his mother was a faculty member at the Rutgers University Graduate School of Applied and Professional Psychology. Bry attended Red Bank Regional High School then Connecticut College, where one of his freshman roommates was Sean Spicer.

Career

Public Apology
Begun in 2009 as a column for The Awl, Public Apology is an epistolary memoir in which Bry recounted his life via letters of apology for what Nathan Deuel described in Bookforum as "misdeeds great and small"; Deuel praised the book's "slyly understated style," saying "Bry’s restraint lends his prose its own brand of keenness and charisma."

In Rolling Stone, Patrick Doyle described the book as "a window into growing up in the late Eighties, when John Hughes films and Def Leppard ruled the world."

Death
Bry died of cancer on October 15, 2017, at the age of 46.

References

External links
 Bry's columns at The Guardian
 Bry's "Public Apology" columns at The Awl
 Bry's "Death & Parenting" columns at True/Slant

1970 births
2017 deaths
People from Little Silver, New Jersey
People from Red Bank, New Jersey
Red Bank Regional High School alumni
Connecticut College alumni
Writers from New Jersey
American writers about music
American editors
Place of death missing
21st-century American non-fiction writers